Fritz Dinger (20 August 1915 – 27 July 1943) was born into an aristocratic German family. Fritz enlisted into the German Luftwaffe in 1939 and would later end up becoming an ace. Fritz was a recipient of the Knight's Cross of the Iron Cross during World War II.  The Knight's Cross of the Iron Cross was awarded to recognise extreme battlefield bravery or successful military leadership. 
Oberleutnant Dinger fought in my battles and was known for his honor and gallantry in Jagdgeschwader 53.
On July 1, 1943 Dinger was promoted to Hauptmann. Fritz Dinger was killed on 27 July 1943 during an Allied bombing raid of Scalea, Italy. Dinger was credited with 67 victories in 600+ missions.

Promotions
1 May 1939 Unteroffizier (Luftwaffe) 
1 August 1939 Feldwebel (Luftwaffe) 
1 November 1940 Leutnant (Luftwaffe) 
1 January 1943 Oberleutnant (Luftwaffe)
1 July 1943 Hauptmann (Luftwaffe)

Awards
Pilot's Badge of the Luftwaffe
 August 1, 1939 - as a Feldwebel
 Front Flying Clasp of the Luftwaffe
 Iron Cross (1939)
 2nd Class
 1st Class
 Wound Badge in Black (1939)
August 16, 1940 WIA - Bf 109 E-3 in combat 50 km N of Cherbourg, ditched in the Channel.
Day Fighter Pilot's Clasp in Gold
December 1, 1942 as an Oberleutnant and Staffelführer of 4. / Jagdgeschwader 53 "Pik As."
 Ehrenpokal der Luftwaffe on 26 October 1942 as Leutnant and pilot
 German Cross in Gold on 5 November 1942 as Leutnant in the I./Jagdgeschwader 53 "Pik As" 
 Knight's Cross of the Iron Cross on 23 December 1942 as Oberleutnant and Staffelführer of the 4. /Jagdgeschwader 53 "Pik As"

References

Citations

Bibliography

External links
TracesOfWar.com
Aces of the Luftwaffe

1915 births
1943 deaths
Luftwaffe pilots
German World War II flying aces
Recipients of the Gold German Cross
Recipients of the Knight's Cross of the Iron Cross
Luftwaffe personnel killed in World War II
Deaths by airstrike during World War II
People from Neunkirchen (German district)
Military personnel from Saarland